is a Japanese football player who plays as a forward for Veertien Mie.

Club statistics
Updated to 23 February 2020.

References

External links
Profile at Zweigen Kanazawa
Profile at V-Varen Nagasaki
Profile at FC Gifu

1986 births
Living people
Yokkaichi University alumni
Association football people from Mie Prefecture
Japanese footballers
J2 League players
Japan Football League players
FC Gifu players
V-Varen Nagasaki players
Zweigen Kanazawa players
Ventforet Kofu players
Veertien Mie players
Association football forwards